Stephanie Summerow Dumas (born May 6, 1955) is a Democratic politician, currently serving as a Hamilton County President of the Commission. She is the first African American woman elected to the position of County Commissioner in Ohio history. She served the duties of vice-mayor (1993-1999) and mayor (1999-2005) in Forest Park, Ohio. She also served as the Village Manager of Lincoln Heights, Ohio (2011-2015).

In 2018, Summerow Dumas was elected as Hamilton County Commissioner, replacing her opponent Chris Monzel. Her term in office began January 3, 2019.

Electoral history

References

External links
 

Living people
Democratic Party members of the Ohio House of Representatives
1955 births
University of Cincinnati alumni
21st-century American politicians
21st-century American women politicians
African-American mayors in Ohio